Luna E-1 No.2, sometimes identified by NASA as Luna 1958B, was a Soviet spacecraft which was lost in a launch failure in 1958. It was a  Luna E-1 spacecraft, the second of four to be launched, all of which were involved in launch failures. It was intended to impact the surface of the Moon, and in doing so become the first man-made object to reach its surface.

The spacecraft was intended to release  of sodium, in order to create a cloud of the metal which could be observed from Earth, allowing the spacecraft to be tracked. Prior to the release of information about its mission, NASA correctly identified that it had been an attempted Lunar impact mission.

Facing continued political pressure to beat the US, Sergei Korolev lost his temper and exclaimed "Do you think only American rockets explode!?" Once again, he knew that the Pioneer 1 probe was set for launch on October 11, but again decided to wait. Just like with the attempt in August, the US Moon shot failed to attain orbit.

Luna E-1 No.2 was launched on 11 October 1958 atop a Luna 8K72 carrier rocket, flying from Site 1/5 at the Baikonur Cosmodrome. One hundred and four seconds after launch, longitudinal resonance within the rocket's strap-on booster rockets caused the vehicle to disintegrate. This was the same problem which had caused the loss of Luna E-1 No.1 three weeks earlier.

References

Luna programme
Spacecraft launched in 1958